A soup-like vegetable curry in Tibetan cuisine that is often served with tingmo steamed bread.

See also
 List of Tibetan dishes

References

Tibetan cuisine
East Asian curries
Vegetable dishes